The New York mandatory opioid antagonist prescription bill is legislation sponsored in the New York State Senate and Assembly. The Senate bill, numbered NY S. 5150-B (along with its companion bill in the state Assembly, A. 5603-B), sponsored by state Senator Pete Harckham, will require prescribers to co-prescribe an opioid antagonist with the first opioid prescription of the year for certain high-risk patients to combat accidental overdoses.

Background 
Since the 1990s the United States has been afflicted by an opiate abuse and addiction epidemic. The epidemic began with doctors over-prescribing opioid pain pills. From 1999 to 2017, more than 399,000 people died from drug overdoses that involved either prescription or illicit opiate drugs.

Naloxone is a pharmaceutical intervention opioid antagonist, available by prescription only, that quickly reverses an opioid overdose, often in seconds. Because opioids suppress breathing, overdoses become fatal when the suppression of breathing reaches the point where the individual stops respiration altogether. Administration of naloxone quickly restores the body's breathing.

Overdose deaths in New York have either declined or been at stable numbers over few years leading up to 2018.

The New York State Department of Health issues an annual “opioid report” as required by Public Health Law Section 3309(5). According to the 2019 report, “The opioid epidemic is an unprecedented crisis. Besides the dramatic increase in the number of deaths identified in the past few years, this epidemic has devastated the lives of those with opioid use disorders (OUDs), along with their families and friends.” The report also indicates that the state's bedrock response to the crisis has been the training of the community and first responders’ reactions to overdoses, increasing access to naloxone to reverse opioid overdoses, and strengthening the Prescription Monitoring Program.

In 2017, in New York state, there were 3,224 overdose deaths. Of those, 1,044 involved “commonly prescribed opioids.”

Legislation 
The bill requires that medical professionals, such as physicians or nurse practitioners, prescribe an opioid antagonist to the all patients receiving their first opiate prescription of the year who fall into any of the following categories:

 Patients with a history of substance abuse
 Patients being prescribed a “high dose” of opiate medication, defined as 50 morphine milligram equivalents per day
 Patients who also have a prescription for an anti-anxiety benzodiazepine drug

The bill applies only to patients receiving prescriptions in an outpatient setting, where the patients would be filling the prescription on their own at a pharmacy. It does not apply to hospice patients or to patients in a nursing home.

If passed by the legislature and signed into law, it would take effect 6 months from the date it was signed by the Governor.

Legislative action 
The legislation was introduced in the 2019-2020 Regular Sessions of the New York State Senate on April 11, 2019, by state Senator Pete Harckham of the 40th state Senate District (portions of Westchester, Duchess and Putnam Counties). The legislation passed the Senate and was sent to the Assembly for committee consideration and a vote. If it passes the Assembly, it will go to the New York Governor for his signature.

When the bill was passed on February 4, 2020, the Senate issued a statement:“The Senate today advanced bills to combat substance misuse and protect New York communities from the scourge of opioid addiction. Additionally, the Senate Majority released a report generated by the Joint Senate Task Force on Opioids, Addiction & Overdose Prevention. The Task Force was charged with holding hearings, visiting treatment sites, and speaking with experts and families impacted by opioid misuse, and using those experiences to guide the Senate Majority on how to best address this crisis. The legislation passed by the Senate takes into consideration the complexity of the opioid epidemic; providing support to those fighting addiction and health care providers, as well as expanding government services.”

See also 

 California Naloxone Requirement Bill
 Colorado Harm Reduction Substance Use Disorders Law
 Illinois Opioids-Covid-19-Naloxone Resolution
 New Jersey Opioid Antidote Prescription Bill
 South Carolina Opioid Overdose Prevention Bill

References

External links
 "Opioid-related Data in New York State,” New York State Department of Health

United States state health legislation